Al-Shorouk (  , "the Sunrise") is a satellite city in the Eastern Area of Cairo, Egypt. As a 'new city' it is administered by the New Urban Communities Authority (NUCA). Shorouk is one of the so-called Third Generation new cities, established by  Presidential Decree 325/1995 allocating 11,000 acres of public land to NUCA, in addidtion to further allocations totalling 53,000 acres by 2017.

Population 
The establishment of the city highlights the efforts of the Egyptian state in managing urban expansion to achieve several development goals. One prominent goal being to absorb the expanding population of Egypt and to ease population pressures currently placed on the aging capital. Other major themes of this project are to redistribute the population of the Greater Cairo area and to raise the standard of living in the region through the provision of new job opportunities from industrial projects in the city. By 2030, 35 years after its inception, Shorouk was palnned to have 500,000 people.

However, according to the 2017 census, it had only 87,285 residents. This underachievement is not just in Shorouk, but across the new city programme where cities are planned according to wholly unrealistic population growth rates, and where they are inequitably distributed (by land area) to capture population growth.

Climate 
The Köppen-Geiger climate classification system classifies El Shorouk as a hot desert (BWh), as is the rest of Egypt. The climate is generally extremely dry around the capital. In addition to scarce rain, extreme heat during summer months is a general climate feature of El Shorouk. Though, daytime temperatures are milder during autumn and winter.

See also
 New Urban Communities Authority
 Satellite city
 Badr
 New Cairo

References 

Cities in Egypt
Populated places in Cairo Governorate
New towns in Egypt